Lowell Hill is a former settlement in Nevada County, California, located south of Washington. In 1880, its population was 75.

A post office serviced the settlement during the period of 1878 until 1918. Lowell Hill is included in a map though 1950.

References

Former settlements in Nevada County, California
Former populated places in California